The New Sarawak Tribune is an English-language Malaysian newspaper published in Kuching, Sibu and Bintulu, in Sarawak that was relaunched after the suspension of the Sarawak Tribune following the publication of the Jyllands-Posten Muhammad cartoons.

Overview and history 
Originally formed by teachers in 1945, the Sarawak Tribune was the second English-language daily in Sarawak and was, prior to its suspension, the state's oldest and largest operating state daily, with over 400 employees throughout the state and 70 editorial staff in Kuching. The daily was regarded as a legacy of British colonial Sarawak. Its sister paper was the state Malay-language daily, Utusan Sarawak. Formerly, its other sister paper was the state Mandarin daily, Chinese Daily News, now known as United Daily. It was last owned by Sarawak Press Sdn Bhd.

2006 Muhammad cartoons controversy 
During the Jyllands-Posten Muhammad cartoons controversy, the daily reprinted a collection of the cartoons on page 17 of the 4 February 2006 edition to illustrate a story on the topic titled "Cartoon No Big Impact Here". The publication drew flak from the Malaysian government, which consisted predominantly of Muslim politicians. As a result, Lester Melanyi, an editor of the newspaper, resigned from his post for allowing the reprinting of the cartoon.

Company advisor Senator Datuk Idris Buang announced that the daily would choose to suspend itself. The paper was officially suspended on 9 February 2006, while a formal letter was delivered to Idris at the daily's main office. The group editor, Toman Mamora, resigned soon after. The daily's indefinite suspension has been generally described as a loss.

Successor 
A new tabloid, the Eastern Times, is said to have replaced the Sarawak Tribune. Its printing license was approved on 1 March, and began publication on 26 March 2006.

The Eastern Times is owned by Total Progressive Sdn Bhd, a subsidiary of a real-estate developing corporation and government-linked company, Naim Cendera Holdings . The company was renamed Eastern Times News Sdn Bhd in May 2006.

Further reading 
 Sarawak Tribune returns to newstands
 Sarawak paper prints Prophet cartoon, editor quits
 End of the road for Sarawak Tribune?
 Sarawak needs new English daily, says top Tribune exec

External links 
 Current website for the New Sarawak Tribune
 

1945 establishments in North Borneo
2006 disestablishments in Malaysia
2010 establishments in Malaysia
Newspapers established in 1945
Publications disestablished in 2006
Newspapers established in 2010
Newspapers published in Malaysia
English-language newspapers published in Asia
Mass media in Kuching
Asian news websites
Malaysian news websites